The Lost Shoe is a 1923 German silent fantasy film directed by Ludwig Berger and starring Helga Thomas, Paul Hartmann and Mady Christians. Its plot is loosely based on that of Cinderella. It was shot at the Babelsberg Studios in Berlin. The film's sets were designed by the art director Rudolf Bamberger.The film premiered on 5 December 1923 at the Ufa-Palast am Zoo in Berlin. It was produced by Decla-Bioscop which was by then part of the large UFA conglomerate.

Cast
 Helga Thomas as Marie
 Paul Hartmann as Anselm Franz
 Frida Richard as Patin
 Hermann Thimig as Baron Steiß-Steßling
 Lucie Höflich as Countess Benrat
 Mady Christians as Violante
 Olga Tschechowa as Estella
 Max Gülstorff as Baron von Cucoli
 Gertrud Eysoldt as Rauerin
 Leonhard Haskel as Prince Habakuk XXVI
 Werner Hollmann as Count Ekelmann
 Georg John as Jon
 Emilie Kurz as Princess Alloysia
 Paula Conrada Schlenther as Princess Anastasia
 Arnold Korff

References

Bibliography
 Hardt, Ursula. From Caligari to California: Erich Pommer's life in the International Film Wars. Berghahn Books, 1996.

External links

1923 films
1920s historical fantasy films
German historical fantasy films
German children's fantasy films
Films of the Weimar Republic
German silent feature films
Films directed by Ludwig Berger
Films based on works by E. T. A. Hoffmann
Films based on Cinderella
Films set in the 18th century
UFA GmbH films
1920s children's fantasy films
German black-and-white films
Films produced by Erich Pommer
Lost fantasy films
1920s German films
Films shot at Babelsberg Studios